This is a list and map of European countries by the Press Freedom Index for the year 2021.

Map

Legend

Table

See also
International organisations in Europe 
List of European countries by budget revenues
List of European countries by budget revenues per capita
List of European countries by GNI (nominal) per capita

References

Press Freedom
EU